Epinotia ramella is a moth of the family Tortricidae. It is found in Europe, China (Hebei, Inner Mongolia, Jilin, Heilongjiang, Sichuan, Gansu, Qinghai, Ningxia), Japan, Russia and Kazakhstan.

The forewings are ochreous-white, with some black scales towards base. The is costa greyish-tinged, strigulated with black. There is a triangular black spot mixed with grey on dorsum before middle, and another less defined on the tornus. The central fascia is ill-marked  and pale ochreous grey. The apex is suffused with dark grey , the ocellus edged with leaden metallic.Sometimes the dorsal 3/5 of the forewing wholly suffused with blackish-grey. The hindwings are grey.

Biology
The moth flies from June to November in Europe.

The larvae mainly feed on the catkins of birch and willow.

Habitat
Epinotia ramella is found Europe, it lives in well wooded areas that contain the larval food plants.

References

External links
 
 waarneming.nl 
 Lepidoptera of Belgium
 Epinotia ramella at ukmoths.org.uk
 naturespot.org.uk

Eucosmini
Moths described in 1758
Moths of Asia
Tortricidae of Europe
Taxa named by Carl Linnaeus